Dalchand was a Rajput painter who worked at the Jodphur court in Rajasthan in the first quarter of the 18th century. He painted several portraits and court scenes of his patron, Maharaja Abhai Singh, before moving to Kishangarh. Dalchand's father was the renowned Kishangarh painter Bhawanidas, who had previously also worked at the Mughal court.

Indian male painters
Painters from Rajasthan
Indian portrait painters